Cecilia Fernandez-Parker (born June 28, 1963) is an American former professional tennis player.

Biography
Fernandez grew up in Los Angeles County, one of four daughters of Ecuadorian civil engineer Carlos and Los Angeles born Dolores. The four sisters are two sets of twins who all went on to play tennis at a high level, with Cecilia and her twin sister Elisa being the youngest. Anna-Maria and Anna Lucia are the eldest twins. While at Bishop Montgomery High School in 1977, both sets of twins played each other in a CIF 4A doubles final, while the team was also coached by their mother.

In the early 1980s, Fernandez played college tennis for the USC Trojans. During this time she represented the United States in the Junior Federation Cup and won a singles gold medal at the University Games in Edmonton. A four-time All American, Fernandez was a member of USC's NCAA Division I Championship winning teams in 1983 and 1985.

Fernandez competed on the professional tour after leaving USC. She made the second round of the 1986 French Open, beating fellow Los Angeles based player Tina Mochizuki in the first round, before losing to Bulgarian Katerina Maleeva.

Retiring from the tour in 1988, Fernandez now coaches at the Jack Kramer Tennis Club in Rolling Hills Estates, California. She is married to Dale Parker and has three children, a son and two daughters.

References

External links
 
 

1963 births
Living people
American female tennis players
USC Trojans women's tennis players
Tennis people from California
Twin sportspeople
American twins
Sportspeople from Los Angeles County, California
Universiade medalists in tennis
American people of Ecuadorian descent
Sportspeople of Ecuadorian descent
Universiade gold medalists for the United States
Medalists at the 1983 Summer Universiade